James Ginty (4 April 1908 – December 1999) was a British middle-distance runner. He competed in the men's 3000 metres steeplechase at the 1936 Summer Olympics.

References

1908 births
1999 deaths
Athletes (track and field) at the 1936 Summer Olympics
British male middle-distance runners
British male steeplechase runners
Olympic athletes of Great Britain
Place of birth missing